SM U-70 was a Type U 66 submarine or U-boat for the German Imperial Navy during the First World War. She had been laid down in February 1914 as U-11 the final boat of the U-7 class for the Austro-Hungarian Navy ( or ) but was sold to Germany, along with the others in her class, in November 1914.

The submarine was ordered as U-11 from Germaniawerft of Kiel as the last of five boats of the U-7 class for the Austro-Hungarian Navy. After the outbreak of World War I in August 1914, the Austro-Hungarian Navy became convinced that none of the submarines of the class could be delivered to the Adriatic via Gibraltar. As a consequence, the entire class, including U-11, was sold to the German Imperial Navy in November 1914. Under German control, the class became known as the U 66 type and the boats were renumbered; U-11 became U-70, and all were redesigned and reconstructed to German specifications. U-70 was launched in July 1915 and commissioned in September.

A part of the IV Flotilla throughout the war, U-70 sank 53 merchant ships with a combined gross register tonnage (GRT) of 137,774. In addition she sank one British  and damaged five merchant ships. On 20 November 1918, nine days after the Armistice, U-70 was surrendered to the British. She was broken up at Bo'ness in 1919–20.

Design and construction 
After the Austro-Hungarian Navy had competitively evaluated three foreign submarine designs, it selected the Germaniawerft 506d design, also known as the Type UD, for its new U-7 class of five submarines. The Navy ordered five boats on 1 February 1913.

The U-7 class was seen by the Austro-Hungarian Navy as an improved version of its U-3 class, which was also a Germaniawerft design. As designed for the Austro-Hungarian Navy, the boats were to displace  on the surface and  while submerged. The boats were designed with five  torpedo tubes; four located in the bow, one in the stern. The boats' armament was to also include a single  deck gun.

U-11 was laid down on 11 February 1914, the final boat of the class begun. Her construction was slated to be complete within 29 to 33 months.

Neither U-11 nor any of her sister boats were complete when World War I began in August 1914. With the boats under construction at Kiel, the Austrians became convinced that it would be impossible to take delivery of the boats, which would need to be towed into the Mediterranean past Gibraltar, a British territory. As a result, U-11 and her four sisters were sold to the Imperial German Navy on 28 November 1914.

U-11 was renumbered by the Germans as U-70 when her class was redesignated as the Type U 66. The torpedo load was increased by a third, from 9 to 12, and the deck gun was upgraded from the  gun originally specified to an  Uk L/30 one.

Early career 
U-70 was launched on 20 July 1915. On 22 September, SM U-70 was commissioned into the German Imperial Navy under the command of Kapitänleutnant Otto Wünsche. U-70 was the second U-boat command for the 30-year-old officer; he had commanded  from August 1914 until a week before assignment to U-70.
In January 1916, Wünsche and U-70 escorted the German blockade runner Marie through the North Sea. On 9 February, U-70 was assigned to the IV Flotilla in which she remained for the duration of the war. U-70 served as an escort again in late February, when she accompanied the German merchant raider Greif.

The second German offensive 
Germany began its second submarine offensive against shipping in February 1916, the month U-70 had joined the IV Flotilla. As in the first submarine offensive, U-boats were sent independently around Scotland to patrol the Irish Sea and the western entrance to the English Channel. The same day she also damaged the British cargo ship Berwindale, en route to Avonmouth with a load of wheat from Galveston, Texas. Near the end of April 1916, Admiral Reinhard Scheer, the new commander-in-chief of the High Seas Fleet (under which U-70s IV Flotilla operated), called off the merchant shipping offensive and ordered all boats at sea to return, and all boats in port to remain there.

Grand Fleet ambush 
In mid-May, Scheer completed plans to draw out part of the British Grand Fleet. The German High Seas Fleet would sortie for a raid on Sunderland, luring the British fleet across "'nests' of submarines and mine-fields". U-70 was one of four U-boats that put out to sea beginning on 18 May to scout the central North Sea for signs of the British fleet. All the boats were to remain on station until 1 June and await a coded message which would report the sailing of the British fleet. Unfortunately for the Germans, the British Admiralty had intelligence reports of the departure of the submarines which, coupled with an absence of attacks on shipping, aroused British suspicions.

A delayed departure of the German fleet for its sortie (which had been redirected to the Skagerrak) and the failure of five U-boats to receive the coded message warning of the British advance caused Scheer's anticipated ambush to be a "complete and disappointing failure". Although U-70 had received the advance warning of the coded message, her crew did not ever see any part of the fleet. The failure of the submarine ambush to sink any British capital ships allowed the full Grand Fleet to engage the numerically inferior High Seas Fleet in the Battle of Jutland, which took place 31 May – 1 June.

U-70s next success came in December when she sank the 5,587 GRT British steamer Pascal on 17 December. Over the next month she sank an additional 14 ships.

Unrestricted submarine warfare 
From the early stages of the war the British had blockaded Germany, preventing neutral shipping from reaching German ports. By the time of the so-called "turnip winter" of 1916–17, the blockade had severely limited imports of food and fuel into Germany. Among the results were an increase in infant mortality and as many as 700,000 deaths attributed to starvation or hypothermia during the war. With the blockade having such dire consequences, Kaiser Wilhelm II personally approved a resumption of unrestricted submarine warfare to begin on 1 February 1917 to help force the British to make peace. The new rules of engagement specified that no ship was to be left afloat.

The first recorded action of U-70 under the new rules of engagement occurred near the end of February 1917, when the U-boat shelled the British-flagged SS San Patricio. The  tanker, encountered by U-70 off the Orkney Islands, survived the attack. In March, U-70 sank twelve ships totaling 25,708 GRT and damaged a thirteenth of 4,666 GRT.

During the month of April 1917, German U-boats succeeded in sinking 860,334 tons of Allied and neutral shipping, a total unsurpassed by any month in either of the two world wars. U-70s contribution came in the form of ten ships of 23,530 GRT sent to the bottom, four of them on the same day, 24 April.

Although the monthly total of tonnage sunk by all U-boats had peaked in April, the losses were over 600,000 tons in each of May and June. U-70 did not contribute to the May tally but her commanding officer, Wünsche, was awarded the House Order of Hohenzollern. U-70 began another productive month in June by sinking the American Line ocean liner  on 4 June. At , Southland was the largest ship sunk by U-70, and one of the largest ships sunk during the war by a U-boat. Throughout the rest of June, U-70 sank another seven ships totaling 26,131 GRT.

After June 1917, U-70 only sank another three ships throughout the rest of the war, one of which was the British Flower-class sloop  on 5 May 1918. Rhododendron had been constructed in 1917 as a purpose built Q-ship, a warship disguised as a merchant ship to lure German submarines within range of their concealed gun batteries. The sloop was patrolling off Mull Head in the Orkney Islands when struck by a single torpedo from U-70. The captain, Lieutenant Commander Charles Arthur Peal, became disoriented in the aftermath of the explosion, and instead of ordering away a "panic party" to draw the submarine within range, ordered the complete evacuation of the ship, which was carried out in great haste and confusion. U-70 approached the burning ship and observed the chaotic evacuation, seizing a petty officer from a liferaft who revealed the ship's true identity. U-70 shelled the wreck and escaped without coming under fire. Rhododendron capsized and sank the following morning, with the loss of 15 men, four killed in the explosion and 11 drowned during the evacuation. Peal and the rest of the crew were heavily criticized for their conduct under fire by an Admiralty board.

In total U-70 sank 54 ships with a combined tonnage of 139,064 and damaged five with a tonnage of 24,971 in her twelve war patrols. She was surrendered to the British on 20 November 1918, nine days after the Armistice, and broken up at Bo'ness in 1919–20.

Summary of raiding history

Notes

References

Bibliography

External links

Photos of cruises of German submarine U-54 in 1916–1918.
A 44 min. German film from 1917 about a cruise of the German submarine U-35.
Room 40:  original documents, photos and maps about World War I German submarine warfare and British Room 40 Intelligence from The National Archives, Kew, Richmond, UK.

German Type U 66 submarines
U-boats commissioned in 1915
World War I submarines of Germany
1915 ships
Ships built in Kiel